Steephill is a historic home located at Staunton, Virginia. It was built in 1877–1878 in the Gothic Revival style, and remodeled in 1926–1927 in the Georgian Revival style. The central portion of the house (the "original" house) is a -story, three bay, brick structure slightly recessed from the wings. The central section has a standing-seam metal gable roof with three gabled dormers.  Flanking the central block are two, two-story wings.

Unfortunately on December 30, 2019, Steephill suffered a large amount of damage from a 2nd alarm fire.

It was added to the National Register of Historic Places in 1984.

References

Houses on the National Register of Historic Places in Virginia
Gothic Revival architecture in Virginia
Georgian Revival architecture in Virginia
Houses completed in 1927
Houses in Staunton, Virginia
National Register of Historic Places in Staunton, Virginia